Chézery-Forens is a commune in the Ain department in eastern France.

The commune of Chézery-Forens was created in 1962 from the union of the villages of Chézery and Forens.

Population

See also
Communes of the Ain department

References

Communes of Ain
Ain communes articles needing translation from French Wikipedia